Dissen-Bad Rothenfelde is a railway station located in Dissen am Teutoburger Wald and close to Bad Rothenfelde, Germany. It was originally built as Hildesheim station in 1846, but was taken down and re-erected in Dissen-Bad Rothenfelde in the 1880s. The station is on the Osnabrück–Brackwede railway. The train services are operated by NordWestBahn.

Train services
The station is served by the following services:

Local services  Osnabrück - Halle (Westf) - Bielefeld

References

Railway stations in Lower Saxony